Walter von Keudell (17 July 1884 – 7 May 1973) was a German forest expert and politician. He served as interior minister of Germany between 1927 and 1928 during the period of the Weimar Republic.

Early life
Von Keudell was born in Castellamare di Stabia, Naples, Italy, on 17 July 1884. He was the oldest son of Robert von Keudell, German diplomat and a member of the Reichstag. His mother was Alexandra von Grünhof. He had a brother, Otto von Keudell, and a sister, Hedwig von Keudell.

Career
Von Keudell started his career in the forest administration in Frankfurt/Oder in 1908. From 1915 he worked at the Reichsgetreidestelle (Reich grain administration). From 1916 to 1920 von Keudell was Landrat at Königsberg (Neumark) (today Chojna). As a result of the failed Kapp Putsch, which he supported, von Keudell had to retire and worked as a farmer at Gut Hohenlübbichow. 

However, he returned to politics and was elected as a member of the Reichstag for the German National People's Party (DNVP) from 1924 to 1930 (after 1929 Christian-National Peasants' and Farmers' Party). 

On 31 January 1927 von Keudell was appointed Reichsinnenminister (minister of the interior) and vice chancellor in the fourth cabinet of chancellor Wilhelm Marx. He was one of three nationalist cabinet members. The cabinet resigned on 12 June 1928 and Carl Severing replaced von Keudell as interior minister on 29 June 1928 when the new government headed by Hermann Müller took office.

Von Keudell joined the Nazi Party in 1933 and from that year was Oberlandforstmeister and head of the Prussian Landesforstverwaltung in Brandenburg.

In 1934, von Keudell became Generalforstmeister. In 1936, Reichsforstmeister Hermann Göring appointed von Keudell as his Staatssekretär and deputy at the Reichsforstamt (ministry of forest affairs). He served in this capacity until 1937. That year he also was a member of the Reichsverkehrsrat (Reich transportation council). Von Keudell was removed from office in 1937 (im einstweiligen Ruhestand) when he refused to implement the forest policy of Göring which advocated the use of the mandatory cutting quota in private forests as in public forests. Friedrich Alpers succeeded von Keudell in the post.

In 1948, von Keudell joined the Christian Democratic Union.

Personal life and death
Walter von Keudell was a devout Protestant. He died in Bonn on 7 May 1973.

References

External links

 

1884 births
1973 deaths
Christian Democratic Union of Germany politicians
German Protestants
German National People's Party politicians
Interior ministers of Germany
Knights Commander of the Order of Merit of the Federal Republic of Germany
Members of the Reichstag of the Weimar Republic
Nazi Party politicians
People from the Province of Naples